William Henry McConnell (2 September 1901 – 1974), sometimes known as Pat McConnell, was an Irish professional footballer who made over 140 appearances in the Football League for Reading and was capped by Ireland at international level. He later served as a Football League linesman and played cricket for Berkshire.

Personal life 
Born in Corbolis, County Louth, Ireland, McConnell moved to Slough, England at the age of four. After retiring from football, he ran a newsagent in Slough.

Honours
Reading
 Football League Third Division South: 1925–26

Individual
 Reading Hall of Fame

References

English Football League players
Association football fullbacks
1901 births
1974 deaths
Association footballers from Northern Ireland
Slough Town F.C. players
Arsenal F.C. players
Reading F.C. players
Irish cricketers
Berkshire cricketers
Pre-1950 IFA international footballers
Sportspeople from Slough